Yavuz Sultan Selim may refer to:
 Selim I (1465–1520)
 SMS Goeben, a German battlecruiser renamed Yavuz Selim after she was transferred to the Ottoman Empire, and later simply as Yavuz
 Yavuz Sultan Selim Bridge, the "Third Bosphorus Bridge" in Istanbul, Turkey
 Yavuz Selim Mosque in Istanbul
 Yavuz Sultan Selim Mosque in Germany